This is a list containing the Billboard Hot Latin Tracks number-ones of 2007.

United States Latin Songs
2007
2007 in Latin music